Eucalyptus polybractea, commonly known as the blue-leaved mallee or simply blue mallee, is a species of mallee that is endemic to south-eastern Australia. It has rough, fibrous or flaky bark on the lower part of the trunk, smooth greyish or brownish bark above, lance-shaped adult leaves, flower buds in groups of between seven and eleven, white flowers and cup-shaped or barrel-shaped fruit.

Description
It has rough, fibrous or flaky, greyish to brownish bark on the lower part of the trunk, smooth greyish to brownish bark above that is shed in ribbons. Flowering mainly occurs from March to August and the flowers are white.

Taxonomy and naming
Eucalyptus polybractea was first formally described in 1901 by Richard Thomas Baker in Proceedings of the Linnean Society of New South Wales from specimens collected near West Wyalong by Richard Hind Cambage. The specific epithet (polybractea) is from the ancient Greek poly- and the Latin bractea, referring to the many bracts of this species, although many eucalytps have "many bracts" at the base of immature flowers.

In 2018, Kevin James Rule described two subspecies, polybractea and suberea but the names have not been accepted by the Australian Plant Census.

Distribution
Blue-leaved mallee has a wide, but sporadic distribution around West Wyalong in New South Wales and between Stawell and Bendigo in Victoria. In grows in mallee shrubland on loamy soils.

Uses

Essential oil
Eucalyptus polybractea leaves are used to produce eucalyptus oil with very high levels of cineole (up to 91%), yielding 0.7-5% fresh weight overall. The oil is primarily used medicinally and for flavoring.

Carbon sequestration
This eucalypt is the most commonly planted tree in Australia as part of carbon offset programs. Primarily, this is because the blue-leaved mallee is native to Australia, can grow effectively in drought conditions and can store a great deal of carbon quickly.

See also
List of Eucalyptus species

References

 Harden, G.J., Flora of New South Wales, Volume 2, .

polybractea
Flora of New South Wales
Flora of Victoria (Australia)
Trees of Australia
Mallees (habit)
Myrtales of Australia
Trees of Mediterranean climate
Bushfood
Crops originating from Australia
Plants described in 1901
Taxa named by Richard Thomas Baker